Styrax officinalis is a species of shrub in the family Styracaceae.

Description
A small very light green, stalked axillary bud is associated with each leaf.  

The inflorescence is short and few-flowered. The corolla has 5–7 petals and many yellow anthers, the calyx is 5-lobed. Flowering period extends from spring to summer (May–June).

Styrax officinalis subsp. redidivus, Styrax officinalis subsp. fulvescens (both native to California) and Styrax officinalis subsp. jaliscana (native to Mexico), were included here, but recent molecular analysis has suggested that they may be diverged to the point of being separate species.

Distribution
This species is native to southern Europe and the Middle East.

Uses
This plant is the "official" source of styrax, an herbal medicine known from ancient times.  Some believe its oleoresin to have been the stacte used together with frankincense, galbanum, and onycha to make Ketoret, the Tabernacle incense of the Old Testament.

References

officinalis
Flora of Lebanon
Flora of Israel
Flora of Turkey
Flora of Palestine (region)
Poisonous plants